Emil John "Dutch" Leonard (March 25, 1909 – April 17, 1983) was an American professional baseball player. He played in Major League Baseball (MLB) as a right-handed knuckleball pitcher for the Brooklyn Dodgers (1933–1936), Washington Senators (1938–1946), Philadelphia Phillies (1947–1948) and Chicago Cubs (1949–1953).

Playing career
In a 20-season career, Leonard posted a 191–181 won–lost record with 1,170 strikeouts and a 3.25 earned run average in  innings pitched. He was a six-time All-Star selection, and became the pitching coach of the Cubs immediately after his playing career ended (1954–1956).

On July 4, 1939, Leonard pitched a complete game and the Senators defeated the New York Yankees in the first game of a doubleheader at Yankee Stadium. At a ceremony between that game and the nightcap, Lou Gehrig, who had recently been diagnosed with ALS, delivered his famous "luckiest man on the face of the earth" speech.

During Washington's  season, Leonard was part of what was possibly the only four-man rotation in baseball history to have been all knuckleball pitchers, joining Mickey Haefner, Johnny Niggeling and Roger Wolff. That year, Leonard put up a sparkling 17–7 won–lost mark (for a winning percentage of .708, third in the American League) and a 2.13 ERA (fourth in the AL—and one of seven seasons in which Leonard would place among his league's Top 10 in earned run average). The Senators contended for the American League pennant, but fell short of the Detroit Tigers by 1 games.

Reportedly, after facing Leonard, Jackie Robinson once said: "I am glad of one thing, and that is I don't have to hit against Dutch Leonard every day. Man, what a knuckleball that fellow has. It comes up, makes a face at you, then runs away." In the 2013 biographical movie about Robinson, 42, former MLB pitcher C. J. Nitkowski plays the role of Leonard pitching against Robinson.

Personal life
Of Belgian descent, Leonard was nicknamed after Hubert "Dutch" Leonard, a left-handed pitcher in the American League between 1913 and 1925. The nickname "Dutch" was also taken in his honor by crime novelist Elmore Leonard, who sported it as a tattoo.

Leonard died of congestive heart failure in Springfield, Illinois, on April 17, 1983, at age of 74.

See also

 List of knuckleball pitchers
 List of Major League Baseball annual saves leaders

References

External links

1909 births
1983 deaths
American League All-Stars
American people of Belgian descent
Atlanta Crackers players
Baseball players from Illinois
Brooklyn Dodgers players
Chicago Cubs coaches
Chicago Cubs players
Decatur Commodores players
Knuckleball pitchers
Major League Baseball pitchers
Major League Baseball pitching coaches
Mobile Bears players
York White Roses players
People from Sangamon County, Illinois
National League All-Stars
Philadelphia Phillies players
Washington Senators (1901–1960) players